Dolichousnea longissima (syn. Usnea longissima), commonly known by the names old man's beard or Methuselah's beard lichen, is a fruticose lichen in the family Parmeliaceae.

Description
This lichen is fruticose, with very long stems and short, even side branches.  It is considered the longest lichen in the world. The stems are usually 15 to 30 cm in length but are sometimes much longer. It is pale green to silvery-yellow. It has a distinct central cord, which is white.

D. longissima may grow to be 20 feet in length. It predominantly reproduces asexually through fragmentation. Spore-producing structures are rarely observed. It can double its length each year.

Distribution
Dolichousnea longissima is found in boreal forests and coastal woodland in Europe, Asia, and North America. In North America, it is primarily found on the Pacific Coast, and the largest populations are concentrated in the Pacific Northwest. It ranges from Upper Midwest into Canada, the Great Lakes region, and extends to the coast of the Atlantic ocean. It was historically circumboreal, but has been regionally extirpated from areas of Europe and Scandinavia. It has been placed on the Red List of
California Lichens, and is considered Endangered in the Norwegian Red List.

The species grows within the canopies of coniferous trees, primarily those found in old growth Douglas fir forests and near bodies of water. Air pollution heavily affects the metabolic functions of the species, and as a result, populations have declined. Industrial logging has also had detrimental impacts on population numbers.

Human use
The species is harvested for decoration. It has also been historically used as a bedding and filtering material. Medicinally, D. longissima is known as an anti-inflammatory due to the presence of the compound longissiminone. It has been described in Chinese herbal medicine dating back to 500 A.D., where one of the names for the species translates to "pine gauze".

References

Parmelia
Lichen species
Lichens described in 1810
Taxa named by Erik Acharius
Lichens of Asia
Lichens of Europe
Lichens of North America